Richard Moore (October 4, 1925 - August 16, 2009) was an American cinematographer. In 1953, Moore teamed with Robert Gottschalk to co-found Panavision.

Early life
Moore was born in Jacksonville, Illinois, on October 4, 1925. He received a bachelor's degree in cinema from the University of Southern California. Following graduation, Moore began working on travelogues and documentaries.

Career
Moore collaborated with Robert Gottschalk in 1953 to co-found Panavision, a motion picture equipment company specializing in cameras and lenses. Among the company's innovations, Panavision developed a specific camera lens for use in widescreen format which is called Cinemascope. In 1972 the Panaflex lightweight silent reflex camera adaptable to either handheld or studio conditions was introduced. In a 2005 interview with Daily Variety, Moore explained that his connections with Panavision seemed to him to be purely by chance, "Becoming a cameraman and becoming part of Panavision was strictly -- I don't know what you'd call it -- luck or fate. It's something that I didn't plan on. It just happened."

Moore left Panavision nine years after the company was founded. His daughter, Marina Moore, explained that Moore departed Panavision because he "didn't want a desk job."

Moore cinematography credits included the 1969 films Winning, WUSA and Myra Breckinridge, which were released in 1970; the 1972 western, The Life and Times of Judge Roy Bean and the 1982 film adaptation of Annie.

Moore directed the 1978 film Circle of Iron, which co-starred Eli Wallach and David Carradine. He produced, directed and shot television commercials throughout his career.

Awards
Moore co-accepted the scientific and engineering award from the Academy of Motion Picture Arts and Sciences in 1959, for the development of a system of wide film motion pictures called Camera 65. In 2004, Moore was honored with the President's Award from the American Society of Cinematographers.

Death
Richard Moore died at his home in Palm Springs, California, on August 16, 2009, of complications from old age. He was 83 years old.

Moore was survived by his son, Stephen V. Moore, and daughter, Marina Moore, who was born in the Bahamas while Moore was shooting underwater scenes for the 1965 James Bond film, Thunderball. He was predeceased by his daughter, Martita Laura, who died in 1994. Moore's marriage to Mary Grace Fuller, who died in 1985, ended in divorce.

Filmography
Annie (1982)
Circle of Iron (1978) (director, not cinematographer)
Hey, I'm Alive (TV movie) (1975) 
The Stone Killer (1973) 
The Life and Times of Judge Roy Bean (1972) 
Aesop's Fables (TV movie) (1971)
Sometimes a Great Notion (1971) 
WUSA (1970)
Myra Breckinridge (1970) 
The Reivers (1969) 
Winning (1969) 
Changes (1969)
Wild in the Streets (1968)
The Scalphunters (1968)
Maryjane (1968)
Young Americans (1967) (Documentary) 
Devil's Angels (1967) 
The Wild Angels (1966)
Daktari (TV Series) (1966)
Operation C.I.A. (1965)

References

External links

1925 births
2009 deaths
American cinematographers
USC School of Cinematic Arts alumni
Artists from Palm Springs, California
People from Jacksonville, Illinois
Panavision
Film directors from California
Film directors from Illinois